RRS Discovery was a British Royal Research Ship operated by NERC.

RRS Discovery (III) was built in Aberdeen in 1962 and named after Robert Falcon Scott's 1901 ship, RRS Discovery. Until 2006, she was the largest general purpose oceanographic research vessel in use in the United Kingdom. Measuring 90 metres in length, and fitted with a broad range of oceanographic equipment, Discovery could also accommodate containerized laboratories. She had berths for 28 scientific staff, and the ability to spend up to 45 days at sea. Her last major overhaul was in 1991, when a new superstructure and power plant were installed and her hull lengthened by 10 metres.

Discovery carried out oceanographic and marine biology research from the National Oceanography Centre, Southampton. She operated as part of a fleet maintained by the Natural Environment Research Council (NERC) National Marine Facilities Division (NMFD), along with the larger RRS James Cook.

In February 2000, Discovery observed some of the largest waves, called rogue waves, up to 29.1 metres (95.5 feet), recorded by scientific instruments up to that time.

Discovery was scrapped at Ghent on 27 February 2013.

References

External links 
 Natural Environment Research Council
 Skipsteknisk AS
 Freire Shipyard

Ships built in Aberdeen
Natural Environment Research Council
Research vessels of the United Kingdom
1962 ships
Rogue wave incidents
Ships built by Hall, Russell & Company